Valley Junction is an unincorporated community in Polk County, Oregon, United States. It is located at the junction of Oregon Route 18 and Oregon Route 22, on the South Yamhill River east of Grand Ronde. A now-abandoned section of the Willamina and Grand Ronde Railway short line passed through Valley Junction. The Fort Yamhill State Heritage Area and Spirit Mountain Casino are nearby.

See also
Willamette Valley Railway#History

References

External links
Historic images of Valley Junction from Salem Public Library
Valley Junction road condition cam from Oregon Department of Transportation

Unincorporated communities in Polk County, Oregon
Unincorporated communities in Oregon